Noyal-sur-Vilaine is a commune in the Ille-et-Vilaine department of Brittany in northwestern France.

Geography
Noyal is some ten kilometres east of Rennes.

Adjacent communes:
Acigné,
Brécé,
Cesson-Sévigné,
Domloup,
Châteaugiron,
Servon-sur-Vilaine,
Ossé,
Domagné.

Population
Inhabitants of Noyal-sur-Vilaine are called noyalais in French.

See also
Communes of the Ille-et-Vilaine department

References

External links

Mayors of Ille-et-Vilaine Association 

Communes of Ille-et-Vilaine